Abraham Abraham (March 9, 1843 – June 28, 1911) was an American businessman and the founder of the Brooklyn department store Abraham & Straus, founded 1865. The chain, which became part of Federated Department Stores, is now part of Macy's.

Early life
Abraham was born to a Jewish family, the son of Judah Abraham, a native of Bavaria who left in 1837 and married Sarah Sussman en route to the United States. Soon after arrival, Judah Abraham opened a store on Murray Street in New York. In 1843 Abraham Abraham was born. He had delicate health, and wanted to be a violinist. During the Civil War, he ran away to Chicago to enlist, but was brought back by his father. At 14, he worked at Hart & Dettlebach of Newark, along with Simon Bloomingdale and Benjamin Altman for $1 a week.

Career
Abraham opened Wechsler & Abraham in Brooklyn in 1865 at 297 Fulton Street. The company later became Abraham & Straus.

He became a Brooklyn philanthropist, establishing the Brooklyn Jewish Hospital, among many other causes. In 1890, he commissioned a house, now demolished, at 800 St. Mark's Avenue in Brooklyn.

Personal life
Abraham married twice. In 1868, he married Isabella Hyams; she died in 1875. In 1882, he married Rose Epstein; they remained married until his death. 
He had three children with his first wife and one with his second wife, Rose: 
Lillian Isabelle Abraham Rothschild (married to Simon F. Rothschild); 
Florence May Abraham Blum (married to Edward Charles Blum); 
Lawrence Emanuel Abraham; and 
Edith Abraham Straus (married to Percy Selden Straus, son of Isidor Straus).

His many notable descendants include grandson Donald B. Straus (son of his daughter Edith), an educator, author, and advisor; great-great-granddaughter Nina Rothschild Utne, a magazine publisher; great-great-grandson  Peter A. Bradford, civil servant and nuclear power expert, and great-great-great-grandson Arthur Bradford, an author and director.

Abraham died on Cherry Island, near Alexandria Bay, New York.

Further reading 
"...And Paramus Makes Ten", internal A&S history document on opening of Paramus Park store, 1974.
"Abraham Abraham, Merchant, Is Dead; Sudden End of a Man of Notable Career, Known for His Broad and Liberal Activities", PDF file with full text of The New York Times obituary, June 29, 1911.

References

1843 births
1911 deaths
Businesspeople from New York City
Jewish American philanthropists
People from Crown Heights, Brooklyn
American people of German-Jewish descent
19th-century American businesspeople
Philanthropists from New York (state)
Abraham family
19th-century American philanthropists